Earth's Own Food Company (previously Soyaworld Inc.) is a health food manufacturing company in Canada.  They are producers and distributors of the So Good, So Nice, So Fresh, Almond Fresh and Ryza brands within Canada.

History
Earth's Own was founded under the name Soyaworld Inc. in 1995 by Maheb Nathoo, and soon grew with an investment from Dairyworld Foods where Mr. Nathoo held the position of Vice President of Finance.

In 2003 Sanitarium So Good Limited purchased 100% control of Soyaworld.  

In early 2011, Soyaworld Inc. was renamed Earth's Own Food Company Inc.

In 2012 Earth's Own ownership group was renamed to Life Health Foods, Inc.  

In 2012 Agrifoods International Cooperative LTD purchased shares of Earth's Own.

See also

 List of vegetarian and vegan companies

References

External links
Earth's Own
Agrifoods

Seventh-day Adventist food and drink companies
Food and drink companies established in 1995
Vegetarian companies and establishments of Canada
Food and drink companies based in Vancouver
Manufacturing companies based in Vancouver